The 1938 Liga Bet season was the second tier league of the Palestine League organized by the EIFA. 

Six teams played in the South division and eight teams were assigned to the North division. However, as the Arab revolt intensified in fall 1938 and with the High commissioner issuing restrictive orders on travel throughout Palestine,  the EIFA created a two-tiered league for the Tel Aviv region, with matches played in the league counting towards the national league. The Tel Aviv League was completed on 14 January 1939 and in February 1939 a new league season began, with teams playing in regionalized divisions instead a national league.

North division
Eight teams played in the division:
 Hapoel Hadera
 Hapoel Kfar Ata
 Hapoel Kiryat Haim
 Hapoel Tiberias
 Maccabi Binyamina
 Maccabi Hadera
 Maccabi Haifa
 SC Atlit

South division

References

Liga Bet seasons
Palestine
2